Grapa may refer to:

 Grąpa, Poland
 Global Revenue Assurance Professionals Association (GRAPA)

See also
 Grappa, alcoholic beverage